Dead Mary is a 2007 slasher film from 235 Films starring Dominique Swain as Kim.

Plot
A young woman and a group of her school friends embark on a holiday weekend at a lakeside cabin to reminisce about their college days, only to run afoul of an evil spirit.

Cast
Dominique Swain as Kim
Jefferson Brown as Matt
Steven McCarthy as Bryce Baker
Maggie Castle as Lily
Michael Majeski as Dash
Reagan Pasternak as Amber
Marie-Josée Colburn as Eve

References

External links

2007 films
American slasher films
2007 horror films
2000s English-language films
2000s American films